Society is a grouping of individuals who are united by a network of social relations and  traditions, and may have distinctive culture and institutions.

Society may also refer to:

Arts, entertainment, and media
 Society (film), a 1989 Brian Yuzna film
 Society (journal), an academic journal founded in 1962
 Society (magazine), an Indian magazine
 Society (play), an 1865 comedy drama by Thomas William Robertson
 "Society" (song), a 1996 song by Pennywise
 Society (video game), an online computer game by Stardock
 The Society (TV series), a 2019 teen mystery drama series on Netflix

Other uses
 Learned society, an organisation that promotes an academic discipline, profession, or a group of related disciplines
 "[Polite] society", a euphemism for the upper class
 Society, a group of Christians similar to a church (congregation)
 Society ball, a type of formal dance party
 Society Islands, a group of islands in French Polynesia
 Society of apostolic life, a group within the Catholic Church
 Student society, a student club
 The Vegan Society, a charity dedicated to veganism
 Society (horse), an American thoroughbred horse

See also
High society (disambiguation)
Secret society (disambiguation)